Siddhartha Bhattacharya (born 10 June 1961) is a politician from the state of Assam. He was a Cabinet Minister of Education of Assam and a Member of the Assam Legislative Assembly from Bharatiya Janata Party.

He had joined Bharatiya Janata Party in 1995 and was party President of Assam unit in 2014 but was replaced by Sarbananda Sonowal ahead of 2016 Assam Legislative Assembly election. He is a National Spokesperson for the Bharatiya Janata Party for the North Eastern region.

Bhattacharya was defeated from Gauhati East constituency seat in 2011 Assam Legislative Assembly election with margin of 3,997 votes by Robin Bordoloi of Indian National Congress. But, he won Gauhati East constituency in 2016 Assam Legislative Assembly election by defeating Bobeeta Sharma of Indian National Congress by a record margin of 96,637 votes.

Bhattacharya is maternal uncle of Indian journalist Arnab Goswami.

References

External links 
 Personal Website

1961 births
Living people
Assam MLAs 2016–2021
Politicians from Guwahati
Cotton College, Guwahati alumni
Bharatiya Janata Party politicians from Assam
Assam MLAs 2021–2026